Big Slide Mountain is a mountain in the High Peaks Region of the Adirondack Park in New York. The mountain is the twenty-seventh highest peak in the High Peaks Region. The peak was named for the prominent steep cliff that rises to its summit. It is located in the High Peaks Wilderness Area.

Because it is relatively close to trail heads and because it offers a close view of the nearby Great Range, Big Slide is a popular day hiking destination. The most popular approach is via the Brothers, a set of rocky crags which offer several views on the way to the summit. It can also be climbed via the Slide Mountain Brook Trail from the Phelps trail in Johns Brook Valley, or combined with Yard Mountain via the Klondike Notch trail (Yard's elevation is 4018 feet, but it is not one of the High Peaks as it is too close to Big Slide).

References

External links
 

Mountains of Essex County, New York
Adirondack High Peaks
Mountains of New York (state)